Harvey Leroy Karman (April 26, 1924 – May 6, 2008) was an American psychologist and the inventor of the Karman cannula, a flexible suction cannula used for early abortion.

Karman was born Harvey Walters in Clatskanie, Oregon. His father abandoned him when he (Harvey) was young. He took the surname of one of his stepfathers, William Karman.

Conviction
In 1955, Karman, who at the time was working towards his doctorate in psychology and who was not licensed to practice medicine, used a speculum and a nutcracker to perform an abortion on a woman in a California motel room, who subsequently died. He was convicted of providing abortion, which was illegal in California at the time. He served two-and-a-half years in state prison.

"Super coils"
Karman also developed the "super coil" abortion technique, which he believed would enable lay practitioners to perform second-trimester abortions with little training or equipment. The coils were inserted into the uterus, where they caused irritation leading to the expulsion of the fetus.  The first trial of the super coil method was on Bangladeshi rape victims under the sponsorship of the International Planned Parenthood Federation.  These generally resulted in high rates of injury to the patient.

One trial of the super coil method took place in Philadelphia, Pennsylvania, on May 13 and 14, 1972. Fifteen women in their second trimester traveled from Chicago to Philadelphia, where convicted serial-killer Kermit Gosnell performed the abortions using Karman's method. A public television crew from a station in New York City filmed the procedures at Karman's invitation. Nine of the 15 had complications, three of those with major complications.

Flexible cannula

Karman invented a soft, flexible cannula for abortions.  At the time of his death in 2008, it was still in wide use around the world.

Personal life

Karman was the father of Janice Karman.

References

Further reading

1924 births
2008 deaths
American abortion providers
People from Clatskanie, Oregon